Jennifer Dixon, CBE, MBChB, FRCP, FFPH, is the chief executive of the Health Foundation, a large independent charity in the United Kingdom. Her work has been recognised by several national and international bodies for her significant impact in driving national health policy making.

Education 
Dixon holds a degree in medicine from the University of Bristol, and a Master’s in public health and a PhD in health services research both from the London School of Hygiene and Tropical Medicine.

Career 
Dixon trained and practiced in paediatric medicine before moving into health policy in 1989. Dixon was awarded a Harkness Fellowship in health policy in 1990, spending a year in New York City. She was policy advisor to the Chief Executive of the National Health Service between 1998 and 2000, Director of Policy at the King's Fund until 2008, where she led the development of the nationally adopted Patients at Risk of Re-hospitalisation (PARR) tool for primary care. Dixon was then Chief Executive of the Nuffield Trust from 2008 to 2013. In 2013 she became Chief Executive of the Health Foundation. Under her leadership, the Health Foundation contributed to a decision by the UK Government to invest an additional £20 billion in the National Health Service (NHS) in 2018 and is publishing on the first of its kind Young People's Future Health Inquiry in 2019.

As a renowned health policy expert, she regularly writes for national newspapers such as The Guardian, Financial Times and Prospect Magazine and is a regular on major current affairs and news programmes such as the BBC and Channel 4 news. Dixon also regularly gives evidence at House of Commons and Lords Select Committees and parliamentary seminars.

Dixon was a trustee of the National Centre for Social Research (NatCen) (2011-2016), and has served on the board of the UK's Care Quality Commission (CQC) (2013-2016),  the UK's Audit Commission (2003-2012) and the UK's Healthcare Commission (2004-2009).

Dixon led a national enquiry about published ratings of quality of NHS and social care providers in England (2013) and later another enquiry about ratings for general practices (2015). She was also a member of the Parliamentary Review Panel for the Welsh Assembly Government advising on the future strategy for the NHS and social care in Wales (2016–2018).

She has also held visiting professorships at The London School of Economics and Political Sciences (LSE), Imperial College London and the London School of Hygiene and Tropical Medicine (LSHTM) and co-authored two books on the NHS.

Awards and recognition 
 2019: Elected Fellow of the Academy of Medical Sciences
 2016: Awarded honorary Doctor of Science degree from the University of Bristol
 2013: Awarded a CBE for services to public health
 2009: Elected Fellow of the Royal College of Physicians
 1990: Harkness Fellowship

References 

Living people
Alumni of the London School of Hygiene & Tropical Medicine
Alumni of the University of Bristol
British women chief executives
Commanders of the Order of the British Empire
Harkness Fellows
Year of birth missing (living people)